24°C is the first EP by South Korean singer Lee Hi, released on May 30, 2019, through YG Entertainment. It is Lee's first release since her three-year hiatus following the release of her studio album in 2016. The EP features the lead single "No One" (누구없소). It is Lee Hi's final release under YG Entertainment.

Background
On January 15, 2019, Lee released the digital single "XI" with Code Kunst; the track was sung live for the first time on MBC Dreaming Radio. Lee received her first music show win for single "No One" through Mnet's M Countdown on June 6.

Music and composition
At five tracks, 24°C is the shortest material in Lee Hi's catalogue. The album explores the dark side of romantic relationships, the loneliness and the longing, the frustrating relationships, and the break-ups. Musically, 24°C combines these mostly darker themes with generally upbeat musical genres.

The opening track of the album, "No One" featuring B.I of iKon, as a reggaeton-infused dance track with a "groovy" tune full of vibrant percussion, smooth melodies, and quirky synths. It expresses the longing of a lonely person waiting for a lover to arrive with a knock on her door. Lee Hi's collaboration with G.Soul, "No Way", is an "unashamedly laid back track" with a piano and a low bass. "Love Is Over" is "a gospel, soul-infused ballad" with a jazzy swing rhythm. It functions very much as a typical break-up tune, reflecting on the struggle to move on the relationship. "1,2" featuring Choi Hyunsuk of Treasure, is a "short but sweet" track. "20Min" is the only self-written song by Lee on the album. The "guitar-led ballad" details her anger and annoyance with a certain someone over gentle guitar strums and the sound of water-drops.

Promotion
Promotion for the EP began following a coming soon poster released by YG Entertainment on May 20, 2019. On May 22, the date and title of the EP were unveiled, with pre-order details following on the same day. On May 25, a concept teaser of the lead single "No One" premiered, and soon after, the track list was revealed on May 27. Lee's first music show appearance was on MBC's Show! Music Core on June 1. On June 5, Lee had a live stage broadcast on Naver Vlive with Vibe, with 40 fans chosen to attend the showcase. On June 11, Lee appeared on JTBC's Idol Room.

Track listing

Charts

Release history

References

2019 EPs
YG Entertainment albums
Lee Hi albums
Korean-language EPs